Mikołaj Nawrocki (born 2 October 2001) is a Polish professional footballer who plays as a midfielder for Świdniczanka Świdnik.

References

External links

2001 births
People from Zamość
Sportspeople from Lublin Voivodeship
Living people
Polish footballers
Poland youth international footballers
Association football midfielders
Jagiellonia Białystok players
Ekstraklasa players
III liga players